Sherlyn Montserrat González Díaz (born 14 October 1985 in Guadalajara, Jalisco), known simply as Sherlyn, is a Mexican actress and singer.

Biography 
Sherlyn showed a passion for music at a young age. After winning a local contest called Vamos a jugar y cantar, she joined a children-oriented group called K.I.D.S., with fellow Mexican singers Dulce María and Fuzz. K.I.D.S.' second album, En el principio, was released, and they participated in a tribute album to Pope John Paul II, titled El pescador.

Sherlyn later began acting in telenovelas. She acted as piojito or Sofía in Marisol. She starred in Clase 406 with Alfonso Herrera, Anahí and Christian Chávez and later starred in Alborada, alongside Lucero. She was cast as Sandy in the Mexican version of Vaselina (Grease), alongside her ex-boyfriend, Aarón Díaz. She was one of the candidates to star as Nessarose in the Mexican version of Wicked but lost the role to Daniela Lujan.

In 2008, she began starring as Rocio in Cuidado con el ángel, alongside William Levy, Maite Perroni and Laura Zapata.

On 27 July 2009 the telenovela Camaleones premiered in Mexico in which she stars in with Irvin "Pee Wee" Salinas, Belinda and Alfonso Herrera. She was then part of the band of the same name while the novela was on air.

In 2010, she was part of the stage play Agosto, worked as a presenter for the TV show Hoy Sábado, and played Ana López in Una familia con suerte. She also acted in the Telehit series Hoy soy nadie (2012), and starred in the novela Amores Verdaderos (2013). She returned to television in 2015, playing Magos in Antes muerta que Lichita.

Filmography

Film

Television

Awards and nominations

Premios TVyNovelas

References

External links 
 

1984 births
Living people
Mexican child actresses
Mexican film actresses
Mexican telenovela actresses
Actresses from Guadalajara, Jalisco
Singers from Guadalajara, Jalisco
20th-century Mexican actresses
21st-century Mexican actresses
21st-century Mexican singers
21st-century Mexican women singers